Vygonoschanskoye Lake is located in the Ivatsevichy Raion, Brest Voblast, of Belarus. It is the sixth largest lake in Belarus.

References 

Lakes of Belarus